Paroxoplus is a genus of beetles in the family Cerambycidae, containing the following species:

 Paroxoplus ornaticollis (Lacordaire, 1869)
 Paroxoplus poecilus (Bates, 1880)

References

Trachyderini
Cerambycidae genera